The Minister of Indigenous Reconciliation and Northern Relations is the minister of the Manitoba government responsible for the provincial Department of Indigenous Reconciliation and Northern Relations.

The minister deals with issues related to Indigenous affairs and reconciliation in the province, and regional economic development in northern Manitoba.

List of Ministers

See also 

 Minister of Crown–Indigenous Relations

References

Notes 

Aboriginal and Northern Affairs, Minister of
Indigenous peoples in Manitoba